The 1995 Benson & Hedges Cup was the twenty-fourth edition of cricket's Benson & Hedges Cup. It was an English limited overs county cricket tournament which was held between 23 April and 15 July 1995.

It had been agreed before the close of the 1994 season that the Benson & Hedges Cup would revert to a zonal system, having been a knockout tournament for the 1993 and 1994 tournaments. Ireland, having entered the tournament for the first time in 1994, retained their place, meaning there were 22 teams.

The competition was won by Lancashire County Cricket Club for a record third time, defeating Kent County Cricket Club by 35 runs in the final at Lord's on 15 July 1995.

Fixtures and results

Group stage

Group A

Source:

Group B

Source:

Group C

Source:

Group D

Source:

Quarter-finals

Semi-finals

Final

See also
 Benson & Hedges Cup

References

Benson & Hedges Cup seasons
1995 in English cricket